Aetheolirion is a genus of monocotyledonous flowering plants in the dayflower family, first described in 1962. It consists of a single species, Aetheolirion stenolobium, endemic to Thailand.

References

Commelinaceae
Monotypic Commelinales genera
Endemic flora of Thailand